The 2014 United States Senate election in Iowa was held on November 4, 2014. Incumbent Democratic Senator Tom Harkin did not run for reelection to a sixth term in office.

U.S. Representative Bruce Braley was unopposed for the Democratic nomination; the Republicans nominated State Senator Joni Ernst in a June 3 primary election. Douglas Butzier, who was the Libertarian nominee, died on October 14 in a single engine plane crash near Key West, Iowa. He was the pilot and the only person aboard the plane. He still appeared on the ballot, alongside Independents Bob Quast, Ruth Smith and Rick Stewart. Ernst defeated Braley in the general election. This was the first open Senate seat in Iowa since 1974. Ernst was the first Republican to win this seat since Roger Jepsen in 1978.

Democratic primary 
Bruce Braley ultimately faced no opposition in his primary campaign and became the Democratic nominee on June 3, 2014.

Candidates

Declared 
 Bruce Braley, U.S. Representative

Withdrew 
 Bob Quast, businessman (running as an Independent)

Declined 
 Chet Culver, former Governor of Iowa
 Jeff Danielson, state senator
 Tom Harkin, incumbent U.S. Senator
 Dave Loebsack, U.S. Representative
 Kevin McCarthy, Minority Leader of the Iowa House of Representatives
 Christie Vilsack, former First Lady of Iowa and nominee for Iowa's 4th congressional district in 2012
 Tom Vilsack, United States Secretary of Agriculture and former Governor of Iowa

Endorsements

Polling

Results

Republican primary 
The Republican primary was held on June 3, 2014. If no candidate won more than 35% of the vote, the nominee would have been chosen at a statewide convention. It would have been only the second time in 50 years that a convention picked a nominee and the first time since 2002, when then-State Senator Steve King won a convention held in Iowa's 5th congressional district to decide the Republican nominee for Congress. Having the nominee chosen by a convention led to fears that the increasingly powerful Ron Paul faction of the state party, led by Party Chairman A. J. Spiker, could have nominated an unelectable candidate.

The convention was scheduled to be held on June 14 but was then moved to July 12. Republican leaders, including Governor Terry Branstad and U.S. Senator Chuck Grassley, as well as four of the candidates for the nomination, criticized the move. Candidates Sam Clovis, Joni Ernst, Matthew Whitaker and David Young signed a letter to the Republican Party of Iowa asking them to move the convention date back, saying that "Essentially gifting [Bruce] Braley an additional 30 days to campaign in a vacuum, while reducing our nominee's time to raise funds and campaign as the general election candidate by an entire month – only serves to strengthen Braley's viability". Spiker responded that the move was necessary to accommodate the 27-day period that the Iowa Secretary of State's office requires to certify the results of the primary. Spiker reiterated his position in September 2013, rejecting calls for a vote by the central committee to move the convention date. He said that nominating a candidate before the primary had been certified would break state law, "which outlines that a ballot vacancy does not exist until the canvass is completed and certified."

Secretary of State Matt Schultz was highly critical of Spiker, saying that "no political party should use the excuse of the final date of the statewide canvass to determine the date of its special nominating convention. Furthermore, to state that it is necessary to hold a special nominating convention after the conclusion of the state canvass is not only misleading, it is false." Following efforts by members of the central committee to call a special meeting to move the date back to June, Spiker agreed and a meeting was held on September 23. The central committee voted 16–1 to move the convention date back to June 14. Statewide Republican leaders and activists and members of the National Republican Senatorial Committee believe that the real reason for the attempt to delay the convention was to give the Ron Paul faction time to organize an insurgent effort to push through a candidate they support, which could have even be Spiker himself or State Party Co-chair David Fischer. The infighting has been traced back to the failure of the NRSC and allies of Governor Branstad and Senator Grassley to recruit a "top-tier" candidate for the race.

Ernst received widespread attention for a campaign ad she released in March 2014 where she employed a tongue-in-cheek comparison between her experience castrating pigs and her ability to cut "pork" in Congress. Many found the ad to be humorous and it was spoofed by late-night comedians including Jimmy Fallon and Stephen Colbert, while some found it to be in bad taste. Before the ad aired, Ernst had struggled in fundraising, and two polls of the Republican primary taken in February 2014 had shown her in second place, several points behind opponent Mark Jacobs. After it aired, a Suffolk University poll in early April showed her with a narrow lead and a Loras College poll showed her essentially tied with Jacobs. By May, she was being described by the media as the "strong front-runner".

In May 2014, Roll Call reported that the Republican primary campaign had become a proxy for the 2016 Republican presidential nomination, with Mitt Romney and Marco Rubio supporting Ernst, Rick Perry endorsing Whitaker and Rick Santorum backing Clovis. Jacobs, who had no such high-profile endorsements, ran as the "outsider".

Ultimately, Ernst won the primary with 56% of the vote, negating the need for a convention.

Candidates

Declared 
 Sam Clovis, radio host
 Joni Ernst, state senator
 Mark Jacobs, former CEO of Reliant Energy
 Scott Schaben, businessman
 Matthew Whitaker, former U.S. Attorney for the Southern District of Iowa and nominee for Treasurer of Iowa in 2002

Withdrew 
 Paul Lunde, attorney and nominee for Iowa's 4th congressional district in 1988 and 1992
 David Young, former Chief of Staff to U.S. Senator Chuck Grassley (running for Iowa's 3rd congressional district)

Declined 
 Terry Branstad, Governor of Iowa
 Bob Brownell, Polk County Supervisor
 Steve Deace, radio talk show host
 Bill Dix, Minority Leader of the Iowa Senate
 David Fischer, Co-chair of the Republican Party of Iowa
 Steve Gaer, Mayor of West Des Moines
 Drew Ivers, Finance Chairman of the Republican Party of Iowa
 Steve King, U.S. Representative
 Ron Langston, businessman and former Director of the Minority Business Development Agency
 Tom Latham, U.S. Representative
 Bill Northey, Iowa Secretary of Agriculture
 Kevin O'Brien, McDonald's store owner and operator
 Kim Reynolds, Lieutenant Governor of Iowa
 Rod Roberts, Director of the Iowa Department of Inspections and Appeals and candidate for governor in 2010
 Matt Schultz, Iowa Secretary of State
 A. J. Spiker, Chairman of the Republican Party of Iowa
 Matt Strawn, former Chairman of the Republican Party of Iowa
 Bob Vander Plaats, social conservative activist, candidate for governor in 2002, 2006 and 2010 and nominee for lieutenant governor in 2006
 David A. Vaudt, chairman of the Governmental Accounting Standards Board and former State Auditor of Iowa
 Stuart Weinstein, orthopaedic surgeon, President of the American Academy of Orthopaedic Surgeons
 Brad Zaun, state senator

Endorsements

Polling 

 ^ Internal poll for Joni Ernst campaign
 * Internal poll for Mark Jacobs campaign

Results

General election

Endorsements

Debates 
On August 29, Ernst and Braley announced their agreement to hold three televised debates in Davenport, Des Moines, and Sioux City, the first debate on September 28, the second on October 11, and the last on October 16.
 Complete video of debate, October 16, 2014

Fundraising

Predictions

Polling 

with Braley

with Culver

with Harkin

with Loebsack

with Vilsack

Results

See also 
 2014 United States Senate elections
 2014 United States elections
 2014 United States House of Representatives elections in Iowa
 2014 Iowa gubernatorial election

References

External links 
 U.S. Senate elections in Iowa, 2014 at Ballotpedia
 Campaign contributions at OpenSecrets
 Iowa U.S. Senate debate excerpts, OnTheIssues.org

Iowa
2014
United States Senate